Carlos Javier Quinchara (born 27 June 1988) is a Colombian triathlete. He competed in the Men's event at the 2012 Summer Olympics.

References

External links
 

1988 births
Living people
Colombian male triathletes
Olympic triathletes of Colombia
Triathletes at the 2012 Summer Olympics
Sportspeople from Bogotá
Triathletes at the 2015 Pan American Games
Triathletes at the 2019 Pan American Games
South American Games silver medalists for Colombia
South American Games medalists in triathlon
Competitors at the 2018 South American Games
Pan American Games competitors for Colombia
20th-century Colombian people
21st-century Colombian people